James Washington Warne (11 April 1879 – 16 August 1958) was an Australian rules footballer who played with St Kilda in the Victorian Football League (VFL).

Family
The son of Francis Warne (1849-1899), and Sarah Warne, née Williams, James Washington Warne was born at Melbourne, Victoria on 11 April 1879.

Football

St Kilda (VFL)
Recruited from Windsor Juniors, Warne played his first match for St Kilda against Fitzroy, at the Brunswick Street Oval, on 16 July 1898, and went on to play in the remaining seven games of the 1898 season.

He played twice in 1899, bring his total to ten matches — his last game was against Fitzroy, at the Brunswick Street Oval, on 27 May 1899.

Prahran (VFA)
Cleared from St Kilda on 1 May 1900, he played for the Prahran Football Club in the Victorian Football Association (VFA) for two seasons: 1900 and 1901.

Footnotes

External links 

 J.W. "Jim" Warne, at The VFA Project

1879 births
1958 deaths
Australian rules footballers from Melbourne
St Kilda Football Club players